Alphonse Couturier (15 December 1902 – 11 August 1995) was a Canadian member of the Legislative Assembly of Quebec for the Quebec Liberal Party.

He studied medicine at the Université Laval, becoming a doctor in 1930.  He studied further at the Post Graduate Medical School in New York City.  He obtained a specialist certificate in general surgery in 1951.  He worked as a surgeon in Rivière-du-Loup, Quebec until 1970, and then in Quebec City until 1982.

He was a school commissioner in Rivière-du-Loup from 1942 to 1948.  He first ran for the Legislative Assembly in Rivière-du-Loup electoral district in the 1952 Quebec general election for the Quebec Liberal Party, but was defeated. However, he was elected in 1956, and re-elected in 1960 and 1962, but was defeated in 1966.  He was Minister of Health from 1960 to 1965, and Minister of Tourism from 1965 to 1966.

External links
 

1902 births
1995 deaths
Quebec Liberal Party MNAs
Université Laval alumni
Canadian surgeons
20th-century Canadian physicians
20th-century Canadian legislators
20th-century surgeons